Inalåhan (formerly, Inarajan) is a village located on the southeastern coast of the United States territory of Guam. The village's original Chamoru name, Inalåhan, was altered when transliterated during Spanish control of the island.

History
The village history predates the 1521 discovery of Guam by the Spanish.  It was the home to the legendary Chief Gadao, and was one of the few villages with sizable populations at the end of Spanish rule in 1898.  In 1950 it had a population of 1,494 with 814 living in the village itself.  Today, it is the best preserved of the Spanish era villages and is known for its rich history and culture, and has been listed on the National Register of Historic Places. The village's population has increased slightly since the island's 2010 census.

Places of interest include the village's pre-World War II church, statue of Chief Gadao, the Gef Pa'go Chamorro Village, the ancient Paintings of Chief Gadao's Cave, and historic village architecture.  The municipality of Inalåhan includes the community of Malojloj, in the hills north of the central village. Malojloj and Inalåhan each celebrate separate village fiestas. Many residents from the Malojloj section of Inalahan, claim themselves to be a separate village, seeing as they celebrate different fiestas and they have their own land boundary. In Southern Guam, it is easily recognisable as to what part is proper to Inalahan, and what is proper to Malojloj.

The Dandan region of Malojloj was the site of a NASA Apollo tracking station and is the current the site of the Layon Municipal Sanitary Landfill for Guam replacing the Ordot Dump. The Landfill was opposed immensely by the residents of the village as well as many environmentalists, but the government of Guam overruled them.

On April 9, 2021, Governor Lou Leon Guerrero signed Bill 60 into law, which changed the official name of the village of Inarajan to Inalåhan.

Demographics
The U.S. Census Bureau counts the following census-designated places in Inalåhan: Inarajan, and Malojloj.

Education 
Guam Public School System serves the island.

Inarajan Elementary School and Inarajan Middle School are in Inalåhan. Southern High School in Santa Rita serves the village.

Inarajan High School, formerly located in Inalåhan, closed in 1997.

Populated places 
 Asagas
 Malojloj

Notable residents
Former Vice Speaker David L.G. Shimizu

Government

References 

 Rogers, Robert F (1995). Destiny's Landfall: A History of Guam: University of Hawai'i Press.

External links 

 Inalåhan Guam at Guam Portal
 Pacific Worlds, 2003
 Inalåhan Map from PDN

 
Historic districts on the National Register of Historic Places in Guam
Historic districts in Guam